Thomas Stephen Eisenstadt (born May 21, 1936) was sheriff of Suffolk County, Massachusetts from 1969 to 1977,
during which time he was the captioned plaintiff in Eisenstadt v. Baird (1972), a landmark United States Supreme Court decision on contraception.

Elected to the Boston School Committee in 1965, Eisenstadt was a strong supporter of desegregation efforts.

References

External links
 Seegal, John F., "Thomas S. Eisenstadt". The Harvard Crimson, March 3, 1966.

People from Boston
Sheriffs of Suffolk County, Massachusetts
1936 births
Living people
Boston School Committee members